Heather Galbraith is a New Zealand fine art curator and academic. As of 2018 she is a full professor at Massey University in Wellington.

Academic career

After a MA from Goldsmiths, University of London, Galbraith worked at City Gallery Wellington and Te Papa before moving to the Massey University, rising to full professor.

She co-curated Francis Upritchard 's New Zealand contribution and deputy commissioner  at the 2009 Venice Biennale, was deputy commissioner again in 2013 and commissioner in 2015.

Galbraith is Managing Curator at SCAPE Public Art in Christchurch.

References

External links
 
 

Living people
New Zealand women academics
Year of birth missing (living people)
New Zealand curators
Alumni of Goldsmiths, University of London
Academic staff of the Massey University
New Zealand women curators